The Cardiff Big Weekend took place annually from 1993 to 2011 and in 2017 as part of the Cardiff Festival organized by Cardiff Council. It lasted three days and was billed as "the UK’s biggest free outdoor music festival".

The Line Up

2017 
Pride Cymru brought back the Big Weekend music festival and included their LGBT Pride Parade to reform it as 'Pride Cymru's Big Weekend'. Cardiff City Hall's Lawn, which was located at the end of the official Pride Parade route, was the venue.

2012 
The Cardiff Big Weekend, which is usually held the second weekend in August as part of Cardiff Festival, was "rested" for a year in 2012 due to the Olympic Football games taking place at the Millennium Stadium (in Cardiff) on August 9 and 10.
In 2013, the music festival was axed and replaced with a temporary 'Beach' area in Cardiff Bay's Roald Dahl Plass.

2011

2010

2009

2008

2007

2006

2005 

Line up also included Chesney Hawkes, Hazel O’Connor, The Christians and Modern Romance.

2004

2003

2002

2001

2000

1999

1998

1997

1996

1995

References

External links 
 Cardiff Big Weekend
 Cardiff Festival
 11 free festivals
 Cardiff Big Weekend details from BBC Wales
 Pride Cymru

Free festivals
Festivals in Cardiff
Music in Cardiff
Music festivals in Wales
Music festivals established in 1995
Summer events in Wales